Miro Hovinen (born April 29, 1992) is a Finnish ice hockey defenceman.

Hovinen made his SM-liiga debut playing with Ilves during the 2012–13 SM-liiga season.

References

External links

1992 births
Living people
Sportspeople from Espoo
Finnish ice hockey defencemen
Ilves players
21st-century Finnish people